Akaitcho Lake is a natural lake in the Kitikmeot Region, Nunavut, Canada. It is fed by the Coppermine River.

The lake is named after Akaitcho, Chief of the Yellowknives.

References

Lakes of Kitikmeot Region